The Visual Effects Society Award for Outstanding Virtual Cinematography in a CG Project is one of the annual awards given by the Visual Effects Society. The award goes to artists whose work in virtual cinematography. It was first awarded in 2003 and 2004 for, under the title "Best Visual Effects Photography in a Motion Picture", before being scrapped from the ceremony. The award was given separately to artists in live-action film, animated film, and commercials/television. These categories were first awarded in 2012. The following year, the category specifically awarding animated film was dropped, with only live-action film and commercial/television being awarded. In 2015, only live-action films were awarded. The following year, the category's title changed to "Outstanding Virtual Cinematography in a Photoreal Project". It has held its current title since 2020.

2000s 
Best Visual Effects Photography in a Motion Picture

2010s 
Outstanding Virtual Cinematography in a Live Action Feature Motion Picture

Outstanding Virtual Cinematography in an Animated Feature Motion Picture

Outstanding Virtual Cinematography in a Broadcast Program or Commercial

Outstanding Virtual Cinematography in a Live-Action Commercial or Broadcast Program

Outstanding Virtual Cinematography in a Photoreal/Live Action Feature Motion Picture

Outstanding Virtual Cinematography in a Photoreal Project

Outstanding Virtual Cinematography in a CG Project

2020s

External links
 Visual Effects Society

References

Visual Effects Society Awards
Awards established in 2003